Foras or Forrasis, in demonology, is a powerful President of Hell, being obeyed by twenty-nine legions of demons. He teaches logic and ethics in all their branches, the virtues of all herbs and precious stones, can make a man witty, eloquent, invisible (invincible according to some authors), and live long, and can discover treasures and recover lost things.

He is depicted as a strong man.

His name seems to derive from Latin foras (out, outside).

See also

The Lesser Key of Solomon

References

Sources
S. L. MacGregor Mathers, A. Crowley, The Goetia: The Lesser Key of Solomon the King (1904). 1995 reprint: .

Goetic demons